Anna Pavlovna Maximovitch (8 May 1901, Chernigov – c. 20 July 1943, Plötzensee Prison, Berlin) was a Russian aristocrat and neuropsychiatrist,  who became an informer and important member of the Red Orchestra organisation in France during World War II.  

Maximovitch was the daughter of a cavalry officer Baron Maximovitch, who held the rank of general, on the staff of Imperial Russian Army. She was a Czarist.
Maximovitch's cover name in radio communication was Arztin.

Life

Maximovitch was a Russian émigré, who left Russia with her brother Basile Maximovitch and her mother Edda in 1922, to escape the Russian Revolution and arrived via Constantinople to settle in an apartment at 12 Rue de Viatau in Paris, France. In Paris, Maximovitch joined the French Army and trained as a nurse before taking part in the Great Syrian Revolt, in a campaign against the Druze in 1925–1926. While there she treated Count Léonor de Rohan-Chabot. After leaving the army she continued her studies and became a neuropsychiatrist, at the time known as a nerve doctor. During the 1930s, Maximovitch ran a nursing home in Thiais.

Around 1936, Maximovitch became a member of the left-wing Union of Russian Defencists, eventually becoming their leader.  The union was an organisation that existed in Paris and Prague to decide whom they should support in the event of war between Russian and Germany. Maximovitch supported the group between 1937 and 1939, by supplying monies to individual members of the organisation. Eventually, the organisation decided to support the Soviet Union. In September 1939, during mobilisation of the French Army, Maximovitch was imprisoned and then quickly released. 

Through her brother, she was introduced to Leopold Trepper in November 1940, who at the time was the technical director of a Soviet espionage network in Europe. In 1940, Maximovitch recruited Käte Voelkner, a secretary who became part of Trepper's group in France. Voelkner worked in the German headquarters with offices in the Chamber of Deputies in Paris. 
She would supply blank forms, stamps and specimen signatures of heads of department for copying.

The money provided by Trepper enabled Maximovitch to open a medical clinic in Choisy-le-Roi in the late 1930s. It was a moneyed, well-to-do area of Paris which enabled her to pick up gossip and recruit from her patients, some of whom were high-ranking French nobility and administrative people, including Rohan-Chabot's husband, Alain Louis Auguste Marie de Rohan-Chabot, who was a French officer and resistance fighter. One of those patients was Helene Claire Marie de Liencourt, Countess de Rohan-Chabot, who rented out the cempty 18th-century Château Billeron, located in Lugny-Champagne to Maximovitch as a both a business that would provid cover for the group and as  safehouse. It also hosted transmitter. 
 
Maximovitch ran the 4th espionage network of Trepper's 7 networks in France.  She was able to provide intelligence from French clerical and royalists groups. Maximovitch also had a special arrangement with Bishop Emanuel-Anatole-Raphaël Chaptal de Chanteloup of Paris that gave her access to the Vatican.

Arrest
Maximovitch was arrested with her brother on 12 December 1942 at 14 rue Émile Zola in Choisy-le-Roi by French police and taken to be interrogated at Rue des Saussaies by members of the Sonderkommando Rote Kapelle, a special Gestapo and Abwehr commission established to track down members of the Red Orchestra in France, Belgium and Low Countries.  After being interrogated, she was sent to Fresnes Prison. A trial was held on 8 March 1943 at 62–64 Rue du Faubourg-Saint-Honoré by Luftwaffe Judge Manfred Roeder, where she was sentenced to death by decapitation.  Along with her brother, she was taken to Plötzensee Prison, where she was executed around  20 July 1943.

Notes

References

1901 births
1943 deaths
French Resistance members
Red Orchestra (espionage)
People from Chernihiv
People executed by guillotine at Plötzensee Prison
People executed by Nazi courts
Executed Russian women
Female resistance members of World War II
White Russian emigrants to France